Rail transport in Tajikistan is limited, as the railroad system totals only  of non-electrified, single-track railway, all of it  broad gauge. The system connects the main urban centres of western Tajikistan with points in neighboring Uzbekistan. In 1999 a new line connected the southern cities of Bokhtar and Kulob. In 2016, another line connected both cities to the capital Dushanbe, thus linking southern and central railway networks together. The northern branch around Khujand remains physically disconnected from this main Tajik railway network, accessible only through a lengthy transit via Uzbekistan. As of 2017, the passenger service remains limited to infrequent international trains from Dushanbe and Khujand to Moscow, one weekly train from Dushanbe to Khujand (via Uzbekistan) as well as a local service between Dushanbe and Pakhtaabad (daily) and Kulyob/Shahrtuz (twice weekly).

The railway system in Tajikistan is managed by the state company Tajik Railway (or Rochi Ohani Tochikiston, https://www.railway.tj).

Difficulties
Passenger transit through Tajikistan has been hindered by periodic failures of Tajik Railways to pay transit tariffs and by safety issues.

Modernisation
A recent agreement between the heads of state of Pakistan, Tajikistan, and Afghanistan will modernise parts of Tajikistan's rail system to allow more trade between Central Asian countries.

See also  
Railway stations in Tajikistan
 North-South Transport Corridor
 Ashgabat agreement, a Multimodal transport agreement signed by India, Oman, Iran, Turkmenistan, Uzbekistan and Kazakhstan, for creating an international transport and transit corridor facilitating transportation of goods between Central Asia and the Persian Gulf.

References  

 
Transport in Tajikistan